Music to Be Murdered By is the eleventh studio album by American rapper Eminem. It was released on January 17, 2020, through Shady Records, Aftermath Entertainment, and Interscope Records. Just like Eminem’s previous studio album Kamikaze (2018), the album was released with no prior announcement. The album was produced by many producers, with Eminem and Dr. Dre serving as executive producers. It features guest appearances from Skylar Grey, Young M.A, Royce da 5'9", White Gold, Ed Sheeran, the late Juice WRLD, Black Thought, Q-Tip, Denaun, Anderson .Paak, Don Toliver, Kxng Crooked and Joell Ortiz. The album's title, cover art, and concept are inspired by Alfred Hitchcock and Jeff Alexander's 1958 spoken word album Alfred Hitchcock Presents Music to Be Murdered By. The album was supported by three singles: "Darkness", "Godzilla" and "Those Kinda Nights". Alongside the album's surprise release, Eminem also released the music video for "Darkness", which revolves around the 2017 Las Vegas shooting from the point of view of the perpetrator Stephen Paddock alternating with Eminem's own.

The album debuted at number one on the Billboard 200, selling 279,000 album-equivalent units in its first week. Subsequently, Eminem became the first artist to have ten consecutive number-one albums in the US and one of six artists to have released at least ten US number-one albums. Music to Be Murdered By reached number one in 16 countries. Music critics praised Eminem's lyrical abilities and the improved production after Kamikaze, while criticism directed towards the album's formulaic song structure, lack of innovation, and shock value.

On December 18, 2020, Eminem released a deluxe version of the album, named Music to Be Murdered By – Side B, without any prior announcement. It includes the original album's 20 tracks along with 16 new ones. It includes a variety of features, with guest appearances from Skylar Grey, DJ Premier, Ty Dolla $ign, Dr. Dre, Sly Pyper, MAJ, and White Gold.

Recording and production
In 2019, A&R representative Mike "Heron" Herard of Shady Records pursued production contributions for a new album by Eminem. This was a departure from his usual process at his company BeatleHustle, which manages sample composers who send their beats to high-profile producers. Eventually, a group of producers had been enlisted for the project, including Eminem's longtime creative partners Royce da 5'9" and Dr. Dre, as well as the latter's colleagues – Dawaun Parker, Lawrence Jr., Dem Jointz, Mista Choc, DJ Silk, and Erik Griggs – and young, burgeoning producers – D.A. Doman (producer of Tyga's "Taste") and Ricky Racks (producer of Future's "Crushed Up").

According to a January 2020 Rolling Stone feature on the album's making, "Lawrence Jr. has been working sporadically with Dr. Dre since the rapper-producer left Death Row Records in the Nineties; starting in the summer, the drummer went into the studio with the rest of Dr. Dre's team to create a suite of tracks that ended up on the back half of Music to Be Murdered By." Lawrence Jr. told the magazine, "Dem Jointz is a producer, Eric Griggs plays keys, bass, and guitar, Dawaun Parker is a keyboard player and producer, myself, I'm a drummer. We know Dre’s instincts, and he’s the coach, the orchestrator."

Other collaborators for the album included Black Thought, Q-Tip, Juice Wrld, Ed Sheeran, Young M.A, Skylar Grey, Don Toliver, Anderson .Paak, Kxng Crooked and Joell Ortiz. On the track "Godzilla", Eminem recorded a third verse that broke the record for the fastest verse on a charted track, rapping 10.65 syllables per second.
 Eminem surpassed his own records held by his featured verse on Nicki Minaj's 2018 song "Majesty", where he rapped 10.3 syllables per second, and his 2013 single "Rap God", where he rapped 9.6 syllables per second.

Title and cover 

The album's title and alternative cover art share the same concept as the 1958 album Alfred Hitchcock Presents Music to Be Murdered By, which interspersed audio of the director Alfred Hitchcock's wry, dark humor into easy listening instrumentals arranged by Jeff Alexander. Eminem tweeted an image of the 1958 album cover featuring Hitchcock holding an axe and a gun to his head and stated that his album's alternative cover was "inspired by the master, Uncle Alfred!" Audio of Hitchcock's voice from the 1958 album is sampled in the interludes "Alfred" and "Alfred (Outro)" and the beginning of the track "Little Engine". Both the 1958 and 2020 albums end with Hitchcock stating, "If you haven’t been murdered, I can only say better luck next time. If you have been, goodnight, wherever you are." Mark Beech of Forbes magazine connected the alternate cover to this album's concept of murder and violence.

The album has three covers; the standard cover features Eminem posing with a shovel, wearing a suit and a fedora. The album's alternate cover features Eminem pointing a gun and holding an axe to his head. The physical CD cover features Eminem, hatless, posing with his hands behind his back. In the packaging, Eminem dedicates the album to rapper Juice Wrld, who died from an accidental drug overdose on December 8, 2019, and Eminem's former bodyguard CeeAaqil Allah Barnes who also died. Juice Wrld's feature on "Godzilla" marked his first posthumous release.

Release 
The album was released on January 17, 2020, by Shady Records, Aftermath Entertainment and Interscope Records. It was released as a surprise with no prior announcement, similarly to his previous and tenth studio album Kamikaze (2018). Alongside the album's release, Eminem also released a music video for "Darkness", directed by James Larese. The video, which revolves around the 2017 Las Vegas shooting from the point of view of the perpetrator Stephen Paddock alternating with Eminem's own, garnered appraisal but controversy too. On January 31, 2020, "Godzilla" was released as a single, with a music video directed by Cole Bennett later being released on March 6.

Critical reception

Music to Be Murdered By was met with generally positive reviews, according to HipHopDX journalist Aaron McKrell. At Metacritic, which assigns a normalized rating out of 100 to reviews from professional publications, the album received an average score of 64, based on 17 reviews, indicating "generally favorable reviews". The aggregator AnyDecentMusic? assessed the critical consensus with an average score of 5.8 out of 10.

Reviewing for The Daily Telegraph, Neil McCormick said Music to Be Murdered By "offers over an hour of the world's greatest rapper blasting away on all cylinders", hailing it as "the first great album of 2020, so lethally brilliant [that] it should be a crime". Scott Glaysher of HipHopDX was also positive, and compared the album to Eminem's previous bodies of work, stating in his review that "Music To Be Murdered By is far from the star-studded, commercially sustainable album Recovery was, but that isn't necessarily a bad thing. On this album, despite its handful of flaws, Em shows strong signs of adapting to the times through modern musical choices and smarter songwriting." Consequence of Sounds Dan Weiss was generally positive, and, about the album's themes, he said that "If he's figuring out from scratch how to be a compelling artist again, Eminem's improved the caliber of his beats and guests, taking stands against the right day-to-day injustices, toning down the tasteless (with the exception of the already-infamous Ariana line, of course), and rapping with the manic precision of someone who just snorted a whole sandcastle of cocaine and Vyvanse. If only a single minute of it was as hilarious or bracing as Chris D'Elia's impression of him." Similarly, Fred Thomas of AllMusic opined, "Music to Be Murdered By sees Eminem pulling himself out of Kamikazes wreckage somewhat, though he still falls victim to moments of willful dumbness and a tedious self-obsession that's become par for the course. On the album's best tracks, there are still hints of the fire that made Eminem a rap legend."

Entertainment Weeklys Christopher R. Weingarten was more critical, stating that, "As a whole, Music to Be Murdered By is as hit-and-miss as anything Eminem has released this side of the millennium. But remove the skits, the relationship songs, the family songs, the morose gun control song, and the quirky Ed Sheeran club goof and you still have 36 solid minutes of the daffy, one-of-a-kind rap genius that keeps captivating true-school heads and longtime fans. Or, if you'd like, keep it all and you still have the most solid work he's done in a few years." NMEs Jordan Basset was ambivalent towards the album's lyrical themes and stated, "He splits the difference on Music To Be Murdered By, indulging his immature ego (griping at bad reviews, stirring controversy for the sake of it) even as he offers salient social criticism and admits his missteps. He's ready to pass on hard-earned wisdom before running his mouth like he hasn't learned his own lessons. And he offers casual fans a hook or two before embarking on another lyrical work-out." Paul A. Thompson of Pitchfork said that the album "is not, strictly speaking, a good record—Eminem hasn't made one of those in a decade—but his latest boasts enough technical command and generates just enough arresting ideas to hold your attention."

Controversy 

The song "Darkness", about the 2017 Las Vegas shooting and told from the point of view of the shooter Stephen Paddock alternating with Eminem's own, has garnered particular attention and critical acclaim.

The lyrics of "Unaccommodating", in which Eminem referenced the 2017 Manchester Arena bombing, drew significant criticism, with many critics finding the lyrics objectionable. The Mayor of Greater Manchester Andy Burnham denounced the song's lyrics, describing them as "unnecessarily hurtful and deeply disrespectful." The lyrics also drew widespread criticism from victims' relatives and others involved in the attack.

Roisin O'Connor of The Independent gave the album a negative review, and criticized the album by saying, "Eminem belittles the trauma of a then 26-year-old Ariana Grande for kicks on 'Unaccommodating' by comparing himself to the Manchester Arena bomber. The sour taste of this track lingers well beyond the album's centrepiece, 'Darkness', which is intended as a searing critique of America's toxic gun culture. Instead, his use of gunfire and explosion samples feels grossly exploitative."

Commercial performance
In the United States, Music to Be Murdered By debuted at number one on the US Billboard 200 chart, earning 279,000 album-equivalent units (including 117,000 copies as traditional album sales) in its first week. This became Eminem's tenth US number-one album and made him one of six artists to have released at least ten number-one albums. The album also accumulated a total of 217.6 million on-demand streams for the album’s tracks. As of December 2020, Music to Be Murdered By had sold over 1,053,000  equivalent units, including 249,000 in pure sales.

Eventually, Music to Be Murdered By was the 9th best-selling album (in pure sales) of 2020 in the United States, with 287,000 copies.

The album debuted at number-one in other countries. It became Eminem's 11th number-one album in Canada, while debuting atop the Canadian Albums Chart with 33,000 album-equivalent units. The album remained at the top spot in Canada for four straight weeks, the longest for an Eminem album since Recovery. It also entered at number one on the UK Albums Chart with first week sales of 36,000 album equivalent units, making Eminem the first artist to release 10 consecutive number one albums in the UK. He also achieved a chart double with Godzilla debuting at number one on the UK Singles Chart.

Track listing
Credits adapted from the album's liner notes.

Notes
 signifies a co-producer
 signifies an additional producer

Sample credits
 "Premonition (Intro)" and "Alfred (Interlude)" contain samples of "Music to be Murdered By", written by Jeff Alexander, as performed by Alfred Hitchcock.
 "Little Engine" contains a sample of "Do Not Stand a Ghost of a Chance With You", written by Jeff Alexander, as performed by Alfred Hitchcock.
 "Farewell" contains a sample of "No Games", written by Craig Marsh and Dave Kelly, as performed by Serani.
 "Alfred (Outro)" contains a sample of "The Hour of Parting", written by Jeff Alexander, as performed by Alfred Hitchcock.
”Yah Yah” samples vocals from Woo Hah!! Got You All In Check, written and performed by Busta Rhymes.

Personnel
Credits adapted from the album's liner notes.

Eminem – vocals, producer , co-producer , additional production , executive producer

Musicians
Black Thought – featured artist 
Adrienne "Aeb" Byrne – additional programming 
Kxng Crooked – featured artist 
Dem Jointz – additional drums 
Focus… – additional drums and keyboards 
FredWreck – additional drum programming , additional keyboards 
Nikki Grier – additional vocals 
Erik "Blu2th" Griggs – bass , additional drums 
Skylar Grey – featured artist 
Juice Wrld – featured artist 
Daniel Kostov – additional programming 
Anders Olofsson – additional programming 
Joell Ortiz – featured artist 
Anderson .Paak – featured artist 
Dawaun Parker – additional drums 
Denaun Porter – featured artist 
Sly Pyper – background vocals 
Q-Tip – featured artist 
Luis Resto – additional keyboards 
Royce da 5'9" – featured artist 
Ed Sheeran – featured artist 
Justin Thomas – additional programming 
Don Toliver – featured artist 
White Gold – featured artist 
Alejandro Villasana – additional programming 
Young M.A – featured artist 

Technical personnel
The Alchemist – producer 
Mark Batson – producer 
Andre "Briss" Brissett – producer 
Tony Campana – assistant engineer 
D.A. Doman – producer 
Dem Jointz – producer 
Dr. Dre – producer , mixing , executive producer
IV Duncan – engineer 
Fred – additional production 
Brian "Big Bass" Gardner – mastering
Quentin "Q" Gilkey – engineer 
Skylar Grey – producer 
Erik "Blu2th" Griggs – producer 
Mauricio "Veto" Iragorri – engineer 
Brian "B-Jones" Jones – engineer 
Trevor Lawrence Jr. – producer 
Victor Levants – engineer , assistant engineer 
 Juan "Saucy" Peña – recording engineer 
Dawaun Parker – producer , additional production 
Denaun Porter – producer 
Ricky Racks – producer 
Luis Resto – additional production 
Robert Reyes – assistant engineer 
Royce da 5'9" – producer 
Joe Strange – assistant engineer 
Mike Strange – engineer , mixing 
Tim Suby – producer 
Julio Ulloa – assistant engineer

Music to Be Murdered By – Side B (Deluxe Edition) 

On December 18, 2020, a deluxe Side B edition of the album, titled Music to Be Murdered By – Side B, was released. Similar to Eminem's previous two albums, it was released without any prior announcement. It contains a bonus disc with sixteen new tracks, with guest appearances by Skylar Grey, DJ Premier, Ty Dolla $ign, Dr. Dre, Sly Pyper, MAJ, and White Gold. The album's release was accompanied by a music video for "Gnat", directed by Cole Bennett. The music video for "Higher" premiered on January 23, 2021. Lyric videos for "Tone Deaf" and "Alfred's Theme" were also released. In May 2021, a remix of "Killer", featuring Jack Harlow and Cordae, was released.

The week the deluxe edition was released, the album saw a 1,125% boost in sale units from the previous week, moving 94,000 units. This brought the album back up to the 3rd spot on the Billboard 200 album chart in its 48th week, a 196 spot jump from the week previous, breaking a 50-year-old Billboard 200 record previously held by Bob Dylan with Self Portrait (1970) which made a 193 spot jump.

Side B was met with generally positive reviews. Robert Christgau appraised the release as "more proof that Eminem loves rhyme as compulsively as MF DOOM himself", adding that, "If he’s not as playful or surreal about it as Doom, he sure does enunciate better, with a timbral dexterity never quashed by the rock-inflected production style that Dr. Dre laid on him decades ago and oversees here." While highlighting lyrics from "Alfred's Theme", "Tone Deaf", "Black Magic", and "These Demons" on Side B, he also observed "more braggadocio and less delight in these words for their own sake than in the Side A's".

Notes

 signifies a co-producer
 signifies an additional producer

Personnel
Credits adapted from Tidal.

Musicians

 Luis Resto – keyboards 
 Ken Lewis – orchestra leader 
 Dominic Rivinius – percussion 
 Sly Pyper – additional vocals 
 Mike Strange – additional keyboards 
 Jerry "Jay Flat" Williams – saxophone 
 Zekkereya El-Megharbel – trombone 
 Chris Lowery – trumpet 

Technical

 Mike Strange – mixer , recording engineer 
 Tony Campana – recording engineer 
 Brett Kolatalo – recording engineer 
 Joe Strange – recording engineer 
 Lola A. Romero – recording engineer 
 Fredwreck – recording engineer 
 Victor Luevanos – recording engineer 
 Quentin "Q" Gilkey – recording engineer 
 Maurecio "Veto" Iragorri – recording engineer 
 Jeremy Zumo Kollie – assistant recording engineer 
 Robert Reyes – assistant recording engineer

Charts

Weekly charts

Year-end charts

Certifications and sales

See also 
Murder ballad

References

External links

2020 albums
Eminem albums
Surprise albums
Shady Records albums
Political hip hop albums
Albums produced by Eminem
Interscope Records albums
Albums produced by Dr. Dre
Albums produced by Dem Jointz
Albums produced by Fred Again
Albums produced by Mr. Porter
Aftermath Entertainment albums
Albums produced by D. A. Doman
Albums produced by Mark Batson
Albums produced by Ricky Racks
Albums produced by Skylar Grey
Albums produced by Royce da 5'9"
Albums produced by Dawaun Parker
Albums produced by Luis Resto (musician)
Political music albums by American artists
Albums produced by the Alchemist (musician)
Albums in memory of deceased persons
Horrorcore albums
Trap music albums